Kevin Friedland (born October 3, 1981) is an American former soccer player, who played as a defender. In high school, he was The Los Angeles Times Orange County boys’ soccer player of the year.  Playing for Southern Methodist University, he was a second-team All American. Professionally, he played for the Minnesota Thunder,  NSC Minnesota Stars, and  Minnesota United FC. Friedland was part of the US squad which won the silver medal at the 2005 Maccabiah Games in Israel.

Early life
Friedland is from New Brunswick, New Jersey, and lived in Irvine, California.

Career

Youth and college
Friedland attended and played soccer at Woodbridge High School in Irvine, California. He was The Los Angeles Times Orange County boys’ soccer player of the year.

Friedland played club soccer for local club Strikers FC. He attended Southern Methodist University, where he was a second-team All American in soccer in 2002.

Professional
Friedland was drafted in the sixth round (53rd overall) of the 2003 MLS SuperDraft by Kansas City Wizards. However, he never played a league game for the team and was waived on November 25, 2003. 

In 2004, he signed with the Minnesota Thunder of the USL First Division. On April 2, 2008, he signed a one-year contract, with a two-year option, with the Thunder.

On March 4, 2010, Friedland was signed as a player/assistant coach for the newly formed club NSC Minnesota Stars.  He was a player/assistant coach for Minnesota United FC.  In November 2013, he announced his retirement. Friedland made over 160 appearances, and won the 2011 NASL Soccer Bowl. At the time, at 10 years he was Minnesota's second-longest active professional athlete with a Minnesota team, trailing only Kevin Williams (Minnesota Vikings).

International
Friedland was part of the US squad which won the silver medal at the 2005 Maccabiah Games in Israel.

He also played for Team USA with Kyle Altman, winning the gold medal at the 2007 Pan American Maccabi Games in Argentina.

References

External links
 Minnesota United FC bio

1981 births
Living people
Jewish American sportspeople
Jewish footballers
American soccer players
Competitors at the 2005 Maccabiah Games
SMU Mustangs men's soccer players
Maccabiah Games medalists in football
Maccabiah Games silver medalists for the United States
USL First Division players
Sporting Kansas City players
Minnesota Thunder players
Minnesota United FC (2010–2016) players
USSF Division 2 Professional League players
North American Soccer League players
Sporting Kansas City draft picks
Association football defenders
Soccer players from California
Soccer players from New Jersey
Sportspeople from Irvine, California
Sportspeople from New Brunswick, New Jersey
North American Soccer League coaches
21st-century American Jews
Minnesota United FC non-playing staff
Player-coaches